Menarandra is a river in the regions of Androy and Atsimo-Andrefana in southern Madagascar. It flows into the Indian Ocean near Bevoalavo Est.

Its annual discharge is low, approx. 2-3 L/s/km at Tranoroa.

References

Rivers of Atsimo-Andrefana
Rivers of Madagascar